Kšice is a municipality and village in Tachov District in the Plzeň Region of the Czech Republic. It has about 200 inhabitants.

Administrative parts
The village of Lomnička is an administrative part of Kšice.

Geography
It lies in the Plasy Uplands.

History
The first written mention of Kšice is from 1369. It was then part of the Stříbro estate. Silver and lead were mined in the vicinity of the village. At the end of the 19th century, the last mine was closed down.

After the Munich Agreement in 1938, the village was annexed by Nazi Germany and administered as part of Reichsgau Sudetenland.

In 1971, Lomnička was joined to the municipality. From 1980 to 1991, Kšice was an administrative part of Stříbro. Since 1992, it has been a separate municipality.

Sights
The Church of the Assumption of the Virgin Mary is the landmark of Kšice. A predecessor of the church was a Gothic building, first documented in 1384. The current church was built in the Baroque style in 1716.

Gallery

References

External links

Villages in Tachov District